Joseph Shabason is a Canadian multi-instrumentalist and composer. He is best known for playing the saxophone. As a band member and session musician, Shabason has contributed to bands such as DIANA, Destroyer and The War on Drugs.

As a solo project, he has released experimental ambient jazz albums under his own name.

Life and education 
Shabason grew up in Brampton, Ontario. He began playing jazz music at 10 years old. After first learning to play the guitar, he took an interest in the saxophone when he enrolled in a jazz program at Humber College as a child. His father was a jazz pianist.

In 2006, he graduated from University of Toronto in jazz performance.

His musical focus shifted from jazz to pop in his twenties.

Collaborations

DIANA 
Shabason is one of three members of DIANA, a Toronto synth-pop band. It formed after another project fell through involving Shabason and Kieran Adams, who met during university.

Its first album, Perpetual Surrender (2013) was longlisted for the Polaris Music Prize. It was followed by Familiar Touch (2016).

Destroyer 
The first Destroyer album to feature Shabason was Kaputt (2010), which was shortlisted for the Polaris Music Prize. Having toured with Destroyer in an opening band, Shabason contacted Destroyer front-man Dan Bejar in 2010 while in Vancouver. This led to Shabason improvising a few hours on the saxophone for the album. His involvement "could not have been more casual," according to Shabason.

Shabason went on to play on Poison Season (2015) and ken (2017), Destroyer's next two albums after Kaputt.

He has toured as a member of Destroyer.

The War on Drugs 
Shabason played an important role in Lost in the Dream (2014) by The War on Drugs.

Other 
As a session musician, Shabason has recorded for many singers and bands — including Born Ruffians, Hannah Georgas, Jill Barber, Matt Barber, Dragonette, The Operators, Allie X, Peter Elkas, The Fembots and Fucked Up.

In 2019, he released an experimental ambient album titled Muldrew with Ben Gunning.

Around 2008, Shabason and a friend started a rock band, Everything All the Time. He played keyboard and sang backup vocals.

Another band he played in was Bass Groove.

He collaborated with Nicholas Krgovich and Chris Harris on the 2020 album Philadelphia, which was a longlisted nominee for the 2021 Polaris Music Prize.

Shabason composed the musical score of the 2021 dark comedy film Stanleyville.

In 2022 Shabason and Andre Ethier released the collaborative album Fresh Pepper. At Scaramouche, Shabason's second collaboration with Krgovich, was released in October 2022.

Solo work

Aytche 
Aytche (2017)—pronounced like the letter "H"—was his first solo album. It was inspired by composers such as Jon Hassel and Gigi Masin.

After the album was finished, Shabason realized that the album reflected the impact that Parkinson's was having in his personal life—his father-in-law was suffering from it and his mother was recently diagnosed.

Only "Westmeath" has vocals. The song features clips from an archival interview from a son of a Holocaust survivor. (Shabason's grandparent were survivors.) A music video of "Westmeath" was directed by Maxwell McCabe-Lokos.

Though Shabason voiced some dissatisfaction with the album, suggesting there was "a lack of vision," it received positive reviews. On Metacritic, the album rated 82 out of 100, indicating "universal acclaim."

The album was funded from a grant by the Ontario Arts Council.

Anne and Anne, EP 
Anne (2018), Shabason's second album, is named after his mother. Focusing on his mother's Parkinson's illness, the album includes audio clips from interviews with his mother.

Shabason was determined that the album not be overly sentimental or exploitative; in his own words, "the challenge becomes how do you take that [interview] and weave it into the fabric of the composition and extract the essence of it without beating people over the head with it." His mother was pleased with the result, calling it a "beautiful album."

Critical reception was positive. On Metacritic, the album is rated 77 out of 100, indicating "generally favorable" reviews. Music critic Miles Bowe of Pitchfork "gorgeous and empathetic ambient music."

Anne, EP has five songs and was released May 10, 2019. The record label describes it as an "afterword" to Anne. Its song "I Don't Want to Be Your Love"—previously a bonus track for Anne—features vocals by Destroyer's Dan Bejar.

The Fellowship 
Shabason's third album was released April 30, 2021.

Discography
Aytche (2017)
Anne (2018)
Anne EP (2019)
Philadelphia (2020) (with Shabason, Krgovich & Harris)
The Fellowship (2021)
At Scaramouche (2022) (with Shabason & Krgovich)

References

External links 
Joseph Shabason on Western Vinyl
Joseph Shabason on Bandcamp

Living people
Canadian multi-instrumentalists
Canadian saxophonists
Canadian ambient musicians
University of Toronto alumni
Western Vinyl artists
Year of birth missing (living people)
Canadian session musicians